Kasungu is a district in the Central Region of Malawi. The capital is Kasungu. The district covers an area of 7,878 km², borders Zambia and has a population of 842,953.

In Kasungu District you can cross the border into Zambia and take the legendary "100 miles of rough road" to South Luangwa National Park in Zambia.  If you survive the road, this is one of the great animal parks of southern Africa. Kasungu was the home to Malawi's first president, Dr. Hastings Kamuzu Banda.

Demographics
At the time of the 2018 Census of Malawi, the distribution of the population of Kasungu District by ethnic group was as follows:
 78.1% Chewa
 15.8% Tumbuka
 1.9% Ngoni
 1.8% Yao
 1.6% Lomwe
 0.2% Tonga
 0.1% Mang'anja
 0.1% Sena
 0.1% Nkhonde
 0.1% Lambya
 0.1% Nyanja
 0.0% Sukwa
 0.1% Others

Government and administrative divisions

There are nine National Assembly constituencies in Kasungu:

 Kasungu - Central
 Kasungu - East
 Kasungu - North
 Kasungu - North East
 Kasungu - North-North East
 Kasungu - North West
 Kasungu - South
 Kasungu - South East
 Kasungu - West

Since the 2009 election most of these constituencies (except Kasungu North, which has been held by members of the Democratic Progressive Party) have been held by members of the Malawi Congress Party.

The district has a number of traditional leaders, among them T/As Kaomba, Kaluluma, Chulu, Santhe, Simlemba, Chisemphere, Chinsinga, Chilowamatambe and Mwase.

Kasungu is also the home to the inventor William Kamkwamba and young politician Joseph Kawelama.

Though the district was a stronghold of the Malawi Congress Party, the party fared badly in the 2009 general elections. The party lost all parliamentary seats in the district, some to independents and mostly to the ruling Democratic Progressive Party. On 20 May 2014, Malawians are again to for general elections. Of late President Dr. Joyce Banda has uncovered a scam were government has been swindled millions of Kwachas thru undelivered items whilst these people have been paid. This has seen some political heavy weights being arrested and the Anti Corruption Bureau and Malawi Police have not yet finalised the arrested.

References

Districts of Malawi
Districts in Central Region, Malawi